Vijaypat Singhania is the former chairman emeritus of the Raymond Group and a former Sheriff of Mumbai, from 19 December 2005 to 18 December 2006.

A keen aviator, Singhania holds the world record for highest altitude gained travelling in a hot air balloon, notably carried out at the age of 67. Singhania also holds a world record for his solo microlight flight from UK to India in 1988. Singhania has over 5,000 hours of flight experience. In 1994 he won the gold medal in the Fédération Aéronautique Internationale air race covering a distance of 34,000 km spanning 24 days. To mark this occasion he was conferred the rank of Hon. Air Commodore of the Indian Air Force. In 2003, he was awarded the Tenzing Norgay National Adventure Award by the Government of India, in 2005 he was awarded the Gold Medal of the Royal Aero Club, and in 2006, the Padma Bhushan, the third highest civilian award by the Government of India.
Singhania wrote the book 'An Angel in the Cockpit', an account of his journey from the UK to India on a microlight aircraft in 1988.
In March 2007 he was nominated to be Chairman of the Governing Council, IIM Ahmedabad (succeeding N.R. Narayana Murthy).

He is entangled in a property dispute with his son, and had this message for parents across the country: "Love your children and care for them, but don't love them so much that you are blinded". In 2015, he handed over his shares, worth over Rs. 1,000 crore, to Gautam Singhania the younger of his two sons, and had this to say in 2017 to NDTV, "In the 79 years of my life, I'd never thought I would have to take a family dispute to court after giving away everything I had and that I wouldn't even have a roof over my head." At the time he was living in rented accommodation and demanding to be reimbursed for the rent.

References

Bibliography

Living people
Businesspeople from Mumbai
Rajasthani people
Recipients of the Padma Bhushan in sports
Recipients of the Tenzing Norgay National Adventure Award
Indian aviators
Indian Air Force officers
Honorary air commodores
Sheriffs of Mumbai
Aviation history of India
Indian aviation businesspeople
Flight altitude record holders
Textile industry in Maharashtra
Balloon flight record holders
Year of birth missing (living people)
Indian aviation record holders
Indian balloonists